The Lost Boys is a 1987 American supernatural black comedy horror film directed by Joel Schumacher, produced by Harvey Bernhard with a screenplay written by Jeffrey Boam, Janice Fischer and James Jeremias, from a story by Fischer and Jeremias. The film's ensemble cast includes Corey Haim, Jason Patric, Kiefer Sutherland, Jami Gertz, Corey Feldman, Dianne Wiest, Edward Herrmann, Billy Wirth, Brooke McCarter, Alex Winter, Jamison Newlander, and Barnard Hughes.

The title is a reference to the Lost Boys in J. M. Barrie's stories about Peter Pan and Neverland, who, like vampires, never grow up. Most of the film was shot in Santa Cruz, California.

The Lost Boys was released and produced by Warner Bros. Pictures on July 31, 1987 and was a critical and commercial success, grossing over $32 million against a production budget of $8.5 million. The success of the film has spawned a franchise with two sequels (Lost Boys: The Tribe and Lost Boys: The Thirst), and two comic book series.

Plot

Michael Emerson and his younger brother Sam move with their recently divorced mother Lucy to the fictional small beach town of Santa Carla, California, to live with her eccentric father, Michael and Sam's grandfather. 

Lucy gets a job at a video store owned by bachelor Max Lawrence. Michael becomes fascinated by Star, a beautiful girl he spots on the boardwalk, though she seems to be with the mysterious David Powers, the leader of a youth biker gang.

In the local comic book store, Sam meets brothers Edgar and Alan Frog, a pair of self-proclaimed vampire hunters. They give Sam horror comics to teach him about the undead threat they claim has infiltrated the town.

Through Star, Michael is drawn into the orbit of David's motorcycle gang. They challenge him with several tests of courage and soon offer him initiation into the gang. During a meal in their hangout, an abandoned luxury hotel sunken beneath the cliff by the 1906 earthquake, Star warns Michael not to drink from an offered bottle, warning it is blood, but he ignores her advice. Soon thereafter, Michael begins to undergo a change; his eyes are sensitive to sunlight, the smell of food revolts him, and his reflection becomes partly transparent. He develops a craving for blood and attempts to attack his brother Sam, but is stopped by Sam's dog Nanook. 

Sam is initially terrified, but Michael convinces him that he is not yet a vampire and desperately needs his help. Sam deduces that, as Michael has not yet killed, he is a "half-vampire" and his condition is reversible upon the head vampire's death. Sam and the Frog Brothers initially suspect Max of being the head vampire but after he passes their "tests" they focus on David.

David tries to provoke Michael into killing but Michael repeatedly refuses. Star reveals that she and Laddie, the youngest of the gang, are also still partly human and that David had intended for Michael to be Star's first kill, sealing her fate as a vampire. 

Michael leads Sam and the Frog Brothers to the gang's lair. They impale one vampire, Marko Thompson, with a stake, awakening David and the others, but the boys escape, rescuing Star and Laddie. Realizing the gang will come after them that night, the teens arm themselves with holy-water-filled water guns, a longbow and wood stakes, barricading themselves in the house. When night falls, David's gang attacks. The Frog Brothers, Sam, and Nanook take out two of the gang while Michael and David battle each other. David is impaled, but there is no change in Michael, Star, or Laddie, forcing the group to conclude they still have not accounted for the master vampire.

Lucy and Max then return home from their date and Max is revealed to be the head vampire. Max explains that he had instructed David to turn Sam and Michael into vampires so that Lucy could not refuse to be transformed herself, as his objective had been to make Lucy mother for his lost boys.

As Max pulls Lucy to him, preparing to transform her, Grandpa crashes his truck through the wall of the house, impaling Max on a wooden fence post and causing him to explode. Michael, Star and Laddie then return to normal. Amongst the carnage and debris, Grandpa casually retrieves a drink from the refrigerator and declares: "One thing about living in Santa Carla I never could stomach: all the damn vampires."

Cast

 Jason Patric as Michael Emerson
 Corey Haim as Sam Emerson
 Kiefer Sutherland as David Powers
 Brooke McCarter as Paul Harris
 Billy Wirth as Dwayne Stephens
 Alex Winter as Marko Thompson
 Dianne Wiest as Lucy Emerson
 Corey Feldman as Edgar Frog
 Jamison Newlander as Alan Frog
 Jami Gertz as Star
 Edward Herrmann as Max Lawrence
 Barnard Hughes as Grandpa
 Chance Michael Corbitt as Laddie Thompson 
 Alexander Bacan Chapman as Greg (Surf Nazi)
 Nori Morgan as Shelly (Surf Nazi)
 Kelly Jo Minter as Maria
 Tim Cappello as Saxophone Player

Production

Background
A March 5, 1985 Variety news item announced that the independent production company Producers Sales Organization (PSO) bought first-time screenwriters Janice Fischer and James Jeremias's Lost Boys script for $400,000 on February 20, 1985. PSO announced their acquisition of the project at American Film Market 1985. Later Warner Bros. joined the project, taking over domestic distribution and some foreign territories.

The film's title is a reference to the characters featured in J.M. Barrie's Peter Pan stories, who – like vampires – never grow old. According to Day, the central theme of The Lost Boys, "organised around loose allusions to Peter Pan", is the tension surrounding the Emerson family and the world of contemporary adolescence. The film was originally set to be directed by Richard Donner and the screenplay, written by Janice Fischer and James Jeremias, was modelled on Donner's recent hit The Goonies (1985). In this way the film was envisioned as more of a juvenile vampire adventure with 13 or 14 year old vampires, while the Frog brothers were "chubby 8 year-old Cub Scouts" and the character of Star was a young boy. When Donner committed to other projects, Joel Schumacher was approached to direct the film although Donner eventually received credit as an executive producer. He came up with the idea of making the film sexier and more adult, bringing on screenwriter Jeffrey Boam to retool the script and raise the ages of the characters.

Casting
Director Joel Schumacher said he had "one of the greatest [casts] in the world. They are what make the film." Most of the younger cast members were relatively unknown. Schumacher and Marion Dougherty met with many candidates. Jason Patric was approached early on by Schumacher to play Michael, but Patric had no interest in doing a vampire film and turned it down "many times". Eventually he was won over by Schumacher's vision and his promise to allow the cast a lot of "creative input" in making the film. According to Kiefer Sutherland, Patric "was really instrumental" in adapting the script with Schumacher and shaping the film.

Schumacher envisioned the character of Star as being a waifish blonde, similar to Meg Ryan, but he was convinced by Jason Patric to consider Jami Gertz, who had just worked with Patric in Solarbabies (1986). Schumacher was impressed, but only at Patric's insistence did he finally cast Gertz. Schumacher was surprised when his first choice for the role of Lucy, Dianne Wiest, accepted the role, as she had just recently won the Academy Award for Best Supporting Actress for Hannah and Her Sisters (1986).

After seeing Kiefer Sutherland's portrayal of Tim in At Close Range, Schumacher arranged a reading with him at which they got on very well. Sutherland had just completed work on Stand by Me when he was offered the role of David. Schumacher said Sutherland "can do almost anything. He's a born character actor. You can see it in The Lost Boys. He has the least amount of dialogue in the movie, but his presence is extraordinary."

Principal photography
Most of the film was shot in Santa Cruz, California, starting on June 2, 1986, and ending on June 23, 1986 after 21 days of filming. Locations include the Santa Cruz Boardwalk, the Pogonip open space preserve, and the surrounding Santa Cruz Mountains. Other locations included a cliffside on the Palos Verdes Peninsula in Los Angeles County, used for the entrance to the vampire cave, and a valley in Santa Clarita near Magic Mountain where introductory shots were filmed for the scene where Michael and the Lost Boys hang from a railway bridge. Stage sets included the vampire cave, built on Stage 12 of the Warner Bros. lot, and a recreation of the interior and exterior of the Pogonip clubhouse on Stage 15, which stood in for Grandpa's house.

Sutherland broke his right wrist while doing a wheelie on his motorcycle and had to wear gloves on set to conceal the cast. His motorcycle for the movie was adapted so he could operate it with his left hand only.

Reception

Box office
The Lost Boys opened at #2 during its opening weekend, with a domestic gross of over $5.2 million. It went on to gross a domestic total of over $32.2 million against an $8.5 million budget.

Critical response
Critical reception was generally positive. Roger Ebert gave the film two-and-a-half out of four stars, praising the cinematography and "a cast that's good right down the line," but ultimately describing Lost Boys as a triumph of style over substance and "an ambitious entertainment that starts out well but ends up selling its soul." Caryn James of The New York Times called Dianne Wiest's character a "dopey mom" and Barnard Hughes's character "a caricature of a feisty old Grandpa." She found the film more of a comedy than a horror and the finale "funny". Elaine Showalter comments that "the film brilliantly portrays vampirism as a metaphor for the kind of mythic male bonding that resists growing up, commitment, especially marriage." Variety panned the film, calling it "a horrifically dreadful vampire teensploitation entry that daringly advances the theory that all those missing children pictured on garbage bags and milk cartons are actually the victims of bloodsucking bikers."

On Rotten Tomatoes, the film has a "Certified Fresh" 76% approval rating based on 75 reviews, with an average rating of 6.4/10. The site's critics consensus reads, "Flawed but eminently watchable, Joel Schumacher's teen vampire thriller blends horror, humor, and plenty of visual style with standout performances from a cast full of young 1980s stars." On Metacritic, it has a rating of 63% based on reviews from 16 critics, indicating "Generally favorable reviews". Audiences surveyed by CinemaScore gave the film a grade of "A−" on a scale of A+ to F.

It won a Saturn Award for Best Horror Film in 1987.

Cultural influence
The mythographer A. Asbjørn Jøn wrote that The Lost Boys helped shift popular culture depictions of vampires. The film is often credited with bringing a more youthful appeal to the vampire genre by making the vampires themselves sexy and young. This inspired subsequent films like Buffy the Vampire Slayer. The scene in which David transforms noodles into worms was directly referenced in the 2014 vampire mockumentary film What We Do in the Shadows. The film inspired the song of the same name by the Finnish gothic rock band The 69 Eyes. Gunship's 2018 Dark All Day music video and lyrics reference the themes and practical effects, on top of collaborating with Tim Cappello.

The music video for "Into the Summer", a song released by American rock band Incubus on August 23, 2019, pays homage to the film.

Event organizers Monopoly Events created "the biggest Lost Boys reunion ever" in 2019 at their annual horror fan convention, For the Love of Horror, which included Kiefer Sutherland, Jason Patric, Alex Winter, Jamison Newlander, and Billy Wirth along with musicians from the film, G Tom Mac, and Tim Cappello, who all appeared at the event and were reunited for the first time in over 30 years. Both G Tom Mac and Tim Cappello performed separate live music sets on the event stage to a vast crowd of fans on both days of the event, while Cappello performed a third time at the event after-party. All of the celebrities posed together for photographs in a purpose-built "cave" set modeled on the vampire cave seen in The Lost Boys original movie which was complete with a poster of Jim Morrison, a bottle of fake blood and David the vampire's wheelchair.

The Frog Brothers make a (non-canonical) cameo in Jenny Colgan's 2001 novel, Looking For Andrew McCarthy, in which they are now police officers and make brief, ominous reference to their past work with "the supernatural".

Adaptations

Novelization
Due to his past fantasy novels and horror short stories, Craig Shaw Gardner was given a copy of the script and asked to write a novelization to accompany the film's release. At the time, Gardner was, like the Frog Brothers, managing a comic book store as well as writing.

The novelization was released in paperback by Berkley Publishing and is 220 pages long. It includes several scenes later dropped from the film, such as Michael working as a trash collector for money to buy his leather jacket. It expands the roles of the opposing gang, the Surf Nazis, who were seen as nameless victims of the vampires in the film. It also includes several tidbits of vampire lore, such as not being able to cross running water and salt sticking to their forms.

Comic books
David makes a reappearance in the 2008 comic book series Lost Boys: Reign of Frogs, which serves as a sequel to the first film and a prequel to Lost Boys: The Tribe.

In October 2016, Vertigo released a comic book miniseries, The Lost Boys, where Michael, Sam, and the Frog Brothers must protect Star from her sisters, the Blood Belles.

Sequels
Kiefer Sutherland's character, David, was impaled on antlers but does not explode or dissolve as do the other vampires. He was intended to have survived, which would be picked up in a sequel, The Lost Girls. Scripts for this and other sequels circulated over the years; Joel Schumacher made several attempts at a sequel during the 1990s, but nothing came to fruition.

A direct-to-DVD sequel, Lost Boys: The Tribe, was released in 2008, more than 20 years after the release of the original film. Corey Feldman returned as Edgar Frog, with a cameo by Corey Haim as Sam Emerson. Kiefer Sutherland's half-brother Angus Sutherland played the lead vampire, Shane Powers.

A third film, Lost Boys: The Thirst, was released on DVD on October 12, 2010. Feldman served as an executive producer in addition to playing Edgar Frog, and Newlander returned as Alan Frog. Haim, who was not slated to be part of the cast, died in March 2010. A fourth film was discussed as well as a Frog Brothers television show but with the dissolution of Warner Premiere, the projects evaporated.

In September 2021, a new film was announced, to be directed by Jonathan Entwistle, from a script by Randy McKinnon, starring Noah Jupe and Jaeden Martell.

Music

Thomas Newman wrote the original score as an eerie blend of orchestra and organ arrangements.

The music soundtrack contains a number of notable songs and several covers, including "Good Times", a duet between INXS and former Cold Chisel lead singer Jimmy Barnes which reached No. 2 on the Australian charts. This cover version of a 1960s Australian hit by the Easybeats was originally recorded to promote the Australian Made tour of Australia in early 1987, headlined by INXS and Barnes.

Tim Cappello's cover of The Call's "I Still Believe" was featured in the film as well as on the soundtrack. Cappello makes a small cameo appearance in the film playing the song at the Santa Cruz boardwalk, with his saxophone and bodybuilder muscles on display. This scene was shown in Family Guy episode Prescription Heroine.

The soundtrack also features a cover version of The Doors' song "People Are Strange" by Echo & the Bunnymen. The song as featured in the film is an alternate, shortened version with a slightly different music arrangement.

Lou Gramm, lead singer of Foreigner, also recorded "Lost in the Shadows" for the soundtrack, along with a video which featured clips from the film.

The theme song, "Cry Little Sister", was originally recorded by Gerard McMahon (under his pseudonym Gerard McMann) for the soundtrack, and later re-released on his album "G Tom Mac" in 2000. In the film's sequel Lost Boys: The Tribe, "Cry Little Sister" was covered by a Seattle-based rock band, Aiden and appeared again in the closing credits of Lost Boys: The Thirst.

Soundtrack

 "Good Times" by Jimmy Barnes and INXS – 3:49 (The Easybeats)
 "Lost in the Shadows (The Lost Boys)" by Lou Gramm – 6:17
 "Don't Let the Sun Go Down on Me" by Roger Daltrey – 6:09 (Elton John/Bernie Taupin)
 "Laying Down the Law" by Jimmy Barnes and INXS – 4:24
 "People Are Strange" by Echo & the Bunnymen – 3:36 (The Doors)
 "Cry Little Sister (Theme from The Lost Boys)" by Gerard McMann – 4:46
 "Power Play" by Eddie & the Tide – 3:57
 "I Still Believe" by Tim Cappello – 3:42 (The Call)
 "Beauty Has Her Way" by Mummy Calls – 3:56
 "To the Shock of Miss Louise" by Thomas Newman – 1:21

Soundtrack charts

Certifications

References

Further reading
 Patrick Day, William (2002). Vampire Legends in Contemporary American Culture: What Becomes a Legend Most. United States: UPK. .

External links

 
 
 
 "The Story Behind The Lost Boys"

1987 films
1987 comedy films
1987 horror films
1980s black comedy films
1980s comedy horror films
1980s supernatural horror films
1980s teen comedy films
1980s teen horror films
1980s monster movies
American black comedy films
American comedy horror films
American supernatural horror films
American teen comedy films
American teen horror films
1980s English-language films
Films directed by Joel Schumacher
Films scored by Thomas Newman
Films set in California
Films with screenplays by Jeffrey Boam
The Lost Boys (franchise)
Supernatural comedy films
Vampire comedy films
Films about brothers
1980s American films